Wesley Koolhof and Matwé Middelkoop were the defending champions but chose not to defend their title.

Leander Paes and Adil Shamasdin won the title after defeating Brydan Klein and Joe Salisbury 6–2, 2–6, [10–8] in the final.

Seeds

Draw

References
 Main Draw

Aegon Ilkley Trophy - Men's Doubles
2017 Men's Doubles